The 30th Hong Kong Film Awards took place on 17 April 2011.

The film Detective Dee and the Mystery of the Phantom Flame, received the most nominations (13) and won most awards (6). The Best Film went to Gallants. The highlights of the year were some clips of past Hong Kong Film Awards played during the ceremony, and in the presentation of giving the Best Director Award by Chow Yun-fat.

Awards
Winners are listed first, highlighted in boldface, and indicated with a double dagger.

References

External links
 Official website of the Hong Kong Film Awards

2012
2010 film awards
2011 in Hong Kong
Hong